Alex Webster (born 1969) is an American bass player who is best known as a member of the death metal band Cannibal Corpse. He is one of two remaining members of the original lineup of the band, along with drummer Paul Mazurkiewicz. He is also the bassist for the band Blotted Science and the supergroup Conquering Dystopia. Before Cannibal Corpse was formed, he was part of Beyond Death.

Musical biography 
Webster was born in Akron, New York. When describing his relationship with music, he has stated "I just always liked music since I was a little kid. Music was always a soundtrack in my head to things going on in my life. I always wanted to play. I wanted to play drums when I was about three. I made a drum out of an old butter container and hit it with tinker toys. I was going to make music. Most people who are musicians didn't have to have anyone tell them to do it. I would never push music on someone, because it is something that doesn't need to be pushed. If you're going to make music, you're going to make it."

Webster was originally of the band Beyond Death, with ex-Cannibal Corpse guitarist Jack Owen, back in 1987. Both met up with Chris Barnes, Bob Rusay and Paul Mazurkiewicz, all of whom were in the band Tirant Sin. Webster was the one to come up with the band's name, Cannibal Corpse. In an interview he said that he thought it was a very catchy name for a band. He has a reputation for being friendly to his fans, often asking questions, and genuinely caring what his fans think, regularly answering questions on the band's forum. Webster also recorded bass for Hate Eternal, Erik Rutan's death metal band. Rutan is the producer for Cannibal Corpse's albums that were released between 2006 and 2012, Kill, Evisceration Plague, and Torture. In 2005, Alex was contacted by guitarist Ron Jarzombek about a possible collaboration which became Blotted Science, an all-instrumental extreme metal project. They released their debut album, The Machinations of Dementia, in the fall of 2007.

When asked about his favorite Cannibal Corpse song, Webster answered: "I don't know, it would be hard to choose one that's the "best", but one of my favorites is "From Skin to Liquid", mainly because it was so different for us. It showed we didn't necessarily have to be playing at warp drive and have gory lyrics to be heavy."

Bass playing 

Webster is recognized as an extremely experienced and talented metal bass player. He can play at exceptionally fast speeds, and does a signature 3-finger walk (a "galloping" finger motion). He revealed in a making-of DVD for Cannibal Corpse's album The Wretched Spawn that he initially started playing guitar but changed to bass because he felt he could master the instrument more quickly. Unlike usual heavy metal bassists that play at high speeds, Webster is able to play his instrument without the use of a pick, while still retaining a clean clear tone, which helps maintain clarity in the complex and very fast lines he plays in conjunction with the heavily distorted guitars of Cannibal Corpse.

"When I was six years old I took some acoustic guitar lessons. It didn't really work out because I was six and didn't really want to learn "Mary Had a Little Lamb," and those were the kind of songs I was being taught. I wanted to play Elvis. I liked all the old 50s music. My dad had a bunch of old 50s records because that's when he was a teenager. Those were what I listened to, because when you're six you don't have the money to go buy stuff, so I just listened to his records. Nobody was going to teach me how to play the guitar like that, out in the country where I lived. I just gave it up until I was 13 or 14. I met a kid in school who played bass in the high school jazz band. He wanted to make some extra money and it was five bucks a lesson. He did a good job too. His name was Mike Hudson. I don't know if he plays anymore. I lost touch with him. He's the one that got me started. I always wanted to play in a band, and to learn how to play lead guitar was going to take like five years. But I really liked the sound of the bass. I liked AC/DC and figured I could do that. I thought I could learn Cliff Williams' bass parts faster than I could learn to play Angus Young's guitar parts. It was motivation, because I wanted to be in a band. I never wanted to sit around and play music by myself. I wanted to play with other people, and the fastest route to that was playing an instrument that wasn't a lead instrument, and bass was that. Now I've learned to make it a lot more difficult. I've made my job a lot harder than it probably needs to be. But it's just fun. In the beginning my concern was playing in a band."

"I took some lessons from a friend of mine when I first started. He was in the school jazz band and he taught me the basics. I didn't take lessons for about a year, but I started again when I was a senior in high school. I've had about four different teachers throughout the years, but I never took lessons for more than a few months. I did, however, gain a lot from them and I've tried to learn as much on my own as I can. Anything I can learn about music or bass playing, I'll try to learn. I mean, the more you learn and the more you apply to your playing, it just makes you a better musician."

"I liked the bass player from AC/DC. I really loved the stuff he did. Peter Baltes from Accept was another. I liked the really good guys too, but that seemed out of reach at the beginning. Geddy Lee from Rush and Steve Harris were like gods to me. Billy Sheehan was from Buffalo, and we all knew about Billy before the rest of the country did. Billy has been a legend in Buffalo for a long, long time. He's still one of my favorites. By the time I was listening to Cliff Burton I was getting a little better. I had been playing a year or so before I started listening to Metallica. I thought he was great. I always thought he could have been a little louder on those albums though. That's the thing. In thrash metal or any other kind of metal where the bass is playing exactly what the guitar is playing, automatically the bass went down in the mix. If you notice those older bands like Accept, the bass is doing something that's a little bit different from the guitar. It's more with the kick drum instead of playing the riff the guitar is doing. In thrash metal and then death metal, the bass player always wound up playing what the guitar player was doing most of the time. It's been a decade long fight for us to be heard in the mix."

"I'd like to do some instructional material, but I'm still not sure if I'll try and do a DVD or book though. It will probably be easier to do a DVD, actually. Hopefully I'll be able to come up with some stuff that's worth releasing. I definitely won't put anything out until I'm sure it's of really high quality, and full of lots of good information. Also, you might have heard about the possibility of us doing a tab book. Well, we still haven't found a publisher for that."

"I practice the most when I have something I'm working on that's difficult, like one of Pat's songs for example. I usually won't practice for more than 3 or 4 hours a day unless I'm really inspired, or I have some kind of deadline."

Besides playing bass, Alex has also contributed to lyric and music writing on many occasions for the band, some examples being "Fucked with a Knife," "Puncture Wound Massacre," "I Will Kill You," "Devoured by Vermin," "Unleashing the Bloodthirsty," "Scavenger consuming death," "Scourge of iron" and "Murder Worship".

Webster is also known for his bass guitar solos/fills in such songs as "Addicted to Vaginal Skin", "Mangled", "The Undead Will Feast", "Crushing the Despised", "Fucked with a Knife", "Hammer Smashed Face", "The Discipline of Revenge", "Put Them To Death", "She Was Asking For It", "Staring Through The Eyes of the Dead", "Bloodlands", "They Deserve to Die", "Rabid", and "The Strangulation Chair".

From 2013 to 2015 Webster wrote a monthly tuition column for the UK's Bass Guitar Magazine.

Equipment 
Webster currently uses Spector 'Alex Webster Signature Edition' (based on Euro 5lx basses), DR Strings, and His signature Hammer Smashed Bass pickups by Seymour Duncan paired with a Darkglass Electronics tone capsule preamp wired for 18 volt operation. All of his signature basses have been set up by scooter at granville guitars and are wired using 4 single stack knobs for reliability on a heavy tour rotation (1 volume with both pick ups hardwired and 3 tone controls) Before his signature model, he used Modulus Quantum 5 and Spector Euro 5lx basses. He also used a white 1987 Fender Precision bass on the albums Eaten Back to Life and Butchered at Birth, an Ibanez Sabre SB900 on the album Tomb of the Mutilated, an Ibanez Soundgear SR1500 on The Bleeding and both a 1971 Precision Bass with EMG Pickups and a Badass bridge on the C# songs as well as a Spector NS Series 5-string bass that was rented on Vile. In the past, he used an Ampeg SVT200T with an Ampeg 8x10 cabinet, then switched to the SVT-4PRO head. Later, he signed an endorsement deal with SWR and used 2 SWR SM-1500 and 2 SWR Megoliath 8x10 cabinets. Currently he is using Aguilar DB 751 and DB810 cabinets. Not much of an effects user, however on the album Torture he stated that he began using a Darkglass Microtubes B3K switched to a B7kU (2016) overdrive pedal and commented that it's the heaviest tone he has achieved yet. He also uses a Radial Bassbone and a Boss TU-2 Chromatic Tuner, and a Seymour Duncan Bass Studio Compressor.

Personal life

Personality
Webster is prominently featured in the heavy metal documentary Metal: A Headbanger's Journey where he displays a depth of music knowledge.

"Cannibal Corpse's bassist Alex Webster exudes a quiet, intellectual and particularly amiable persona which seems so at odds with the music that he is a driving force behind that one is immediately reminded of the old adage about not judging books by their covers."- Sinister Online

When asked about what he likes to do in his spare time outside of Cannibal Corpse, Webster commented: "working out, I’ve been doing some martial arts stuff for a while  now, so I just like to run, I like to go mountain biking"

"I'm not very proud of myself if I lose my temper. That's something I would love to be able to change. I've worked on it throughout my life and hope to eventually have it conquered and react as peacefully as Gandhi in the worst situation."

"Forrest Gump, that was OK actually, but I prefer... I'll tell you what one of my favorite all-time movies was, as far as horror. I like The Shining and I like Jacob's Ladder. I don't know if you'd call Jacob's Ladder horror anyway, but I really liked that movie. I like, Jesus there's a lot of them... I like the Evil Dead stuff, just total splatter action and Nekromantik from Germany. I have a very bad copy of Necromantik 2 and it's all in German and you can barely watch it. You can't even see the picture, really, but I saw Necromantik 1 and it's classic. I was just in a bar in Paris where they were playing Necromantik while you were just hanging about in the bar – yes!" "I just like the really low budget splatter. It's fun. And I like high budget psychological horror like Jacob's Ladder and The Shining. Everything's entertaining for different reasons. Here's kinda the way I see it: you can appreciate a lot of different things for what they are. Like, we're obviously a much different type of death metal band from, say, My Dying Bride or something like that, but there's no reason you can't appreciate both of them for what they are. I like Anathema and My Dying Bride. I also like Morbid Angel and Vader, and I also like us and Autopsy – of course I like us! I'm in the band! You know what I mean. It's good for what it is. When I see a movie like Evil Dead I don't expect it to be like The Shining, just like a person who likes Cannibal Corpse. They shouldn't expect us to be like Anathema. You know what I'm saying? But they can like us for being... the Evil Dead of death metal! [laughs] And they can like those other bands for being more psychological or whatnot." Alex is agnostic.

Honors
The fossil marine worm species Websteroprion armstrongi is named for Webster; the researchers who named it — both heavy-metal fans — stated that "Alex Webster just seemed like the perfect fit for a giant worm with saw-like jaws".

Favorites
"Films: Phantasm, Fargo, The Reflecting Skin, Burnt Offerings, The Shining, Goodfellas, Casino, Braveheart, Saving Private Ryan, The Exorcist, Full Metal Jacket, The Warriors, City of God, Romper Stomper, The Lord of the Rings film trilogy, Freddy Got Fingered, The Road Warrior, and tons more..."

Television: "Most of the original programming on HBO; I also watch the news a lot."

Books: 1984 by George Orwell, Murder Machine by Gene Mustain and Jerry Capeci, The Westies by T.J. English, The Lord of the Rings and The Silmarillion by Tolkien, Gulag by Anne Applebaum, etc..."

When asked about his favorite song on the Morbid Angel album Altars of Madness, Webster answered: "that whole album is so amazing, it's hard to choose. Maybe "Chapel of Ghouls", "Immortal Rites", or "Visions from the Darkside"."

In a 2006 interview, he commented that his favorite albums of the previous five years are Spawn of Possession's Cabinet, Necrophagist's Epitaph, Aeon's Bleeding the False, Hate Eternal's I, Monarch, and Spastic Ink's Ink Compatible.

His five all-time favorite albums are (in descending order) Accept's Restless and Wild, Morbid Angel's Altars of Madness, Metallica's Master of Puppets, Iron Maiden's Powerslave and Slayer's Reign in Blood.

Musical tastes
Alex Webster is a big Slayer fan. "I got into them back in the mid 80's. I learned about them through word of mouth from some other metal heads at my school. They were the best of the evil thrash bands at the time. I can't really stress how much I and the other Cannibal guys listened to Slayer. They were a massive influence on us." He said that his favorite song lyric would be "anything by Slayer.." He also said if any band could cover a Cannibal Corpse song, it would be Slayer.

References 

1969 births
Living people
American rock bass guitarists
American agnostics
American heavy metal bass guitarists
American male bass guitarists
People from Akron, New York
Death metal musicians
Cannibal Corpse members
American male guitarists
Guitarists from New York (state)
20th-century American guitarists
Blotted Science members
Conquering Dystopia members